The Argentine presidential election of 1886 was held on 11 April to choose the president of Argentina. Miguel Juárez Celman was elected president.

Background

Confident of his authority following six years of peace and prosperity, President Roca was by then known for his shrewdness as "the fox." Enjoying the support of the agricultural elites - as well as of the London financial powerhouse, Barings Bank - Roca daringly fielded his son-in-law, Córdoba Province Governor Miguel Juárez Celman, as the PAN candidate for president. A number of distinguished candidates appeared, including Buenos Aires Governor Dardo Rocha and Foreign Minister Bernardo de Irigoyen. Roca tolerated no opposition against his dauphin, however, who was selected nearly unanimously on 11 April 1886.

Results

Results by Province

Notes

References

 
 
 

 

Argentina
1886 in Argentina
1886
Elections in Argentina
April 1886 events